Hopper is the codename for Nvidia's GPU Datacenter microarchitecture that will be parallel release of Ada Lovelace (for the consumer segment). It is named after the American computer scientist and United States Navy Rear Admiral Grace Hopper. Hopper was once rumored to be Nvidia's first generation of GPUs that will use multi-chip modules (MCMs), although the H100 announcement showed a massive monolithic die. Nvidia officially announced the Hopper GPU microarchitecture and H100 GPU at GTC 2022 on March 22, 2022.

Details
Architectural improvements of the Hopper architecture include the following:

 CUDA Compute Capability 9.0
 TSMC N4 FinFET process
 Fourth-generation Tensor Cores with FP8, FP16, bfloat16, TensorFloat-32 (TF32) and FP64 support and sparsity acceleration.
 New Nvidia Transformer Engine with FP8 and FP16
 New DPX instructions
 High Bandwidth Memory 3 (HBM3) on H100 80GB
 Double FP32 cores per Streaming Multiprocessor (SM)
 NVLink 4.0 
 PCI Express 5.0 with SR-IOV support (SR-IOV is reserved only for H100)
 Second Generation Multi-instance GPU (MIG) virtualization and GPU partitioning feature in H100 supporting up to seven instances
 PureVideo feature set  hardware video decoding
 8 NVDEC for H100
 Adds new hardware-based single-core JPEG decode with 7 NVJPG hardware decoders (NVJPG) with YUV420, YUV422, YUV444, YUV400, RGBA. Should not be confused with Nvidia NVJPEG (GPU-accelerated library for JPEG encoding/decoding)

Chips
 GH100

Comparison of Compute Capability: GP100 vs GV100 vs GA100 vs GH100

Comparison of Precision Support Matrix  

Legend:
 FPnn: floating point with nn bits
 INTn: integer with n bits
 INT1: binary
 TF32: TensorFloat32
 BF16: bfloat16

Comparison of Decode Performance

Products using Hopper

 Nvidia Data Center GPUs
 Nvidia H100 80GB (GH100)

See also
 List of eponyms of Nvidia GPU microarchitectures

References

Nvidia microarchitectures
Nvidia Hopper